Tritonia dantarti is a species of dendronotid nudibranch. It is a marine gastropod mollusc in the family Tritoniidae.

Distribution
This species was described from depths of 134 m off Bouvet Island, Southern Ocean, .

References

Tritoniidae
Gastropods described in 2006